Lewis Alsamari (born 1976) is an Iraqi actor based in the United Kingdom.

Career
Alsamari has appeared in episodes of television series such as Spooks and Crossroads.  In 2006 he starred in the Universal Pictures film United 93 as the terrorist Saeed al-Ghamdi.

Alsamari was reported to have been denied a visa by American immigration authorities when he applied to visit New York City to attend the premiere of United 93. The reason reportedly given was that he had once been a conscripted member of the Iraqi Army – although this was also the grounds for his refugee status after his desertion in 1993. Other sources say that he applied late for his visa and that it was not denied.

Alsamari was featured in the Edinburgh Festival Fringe production of "What I Heard About Iraq", based on the Eliot Weinberger article of the same name that originally appeared in the London Review of Books in 2005.

Filmography

Bibliography

References

External links

1976 births
Living people
British people of Iraqi descent
English male film actors
English male stage actors
Iraqi male television actors
Iraqi refugees
Iraqi emigrants to the United Kingdom
Iraqi male film actors